Kaithi is a historical script used widely in parts of North India.

Kaithi may also refer to:
 Kaithi (1951 film), a black-and-white Tamil thriller film
 Kaithi (2019 film), an Indian Tamil-language action thriller film
 Kaithi (Unicode block), a Unicode block